Dominique Cardona (born 1955) is an Argentinian-born Canadian film director, producer, and screenwriter. She works primarily but not exclusively in collaboration with Laurie Colbert. The duo are most noted for their 1999 short film Below the Belt, which was a Genie Award nominee for Best Live Action Short Drama at the 21st Genie Awards in 2000, and their feature film Margarita, which won the Audience Award for Best Feature Film at the Inside Out Film and Video Festival in 2012.

Their other films have included the documentary shorts Thank God I'm a Lesbian (1992) and My Feminism (1997) and the feature films Finn's Girl (2007) and Catch and Release (2018).

Separately from Colbert, Cardona has also directed episodes of the television series Amélie et compagnie.

References

External links

1955 births
20th-century Canadian screenwriters
20th-century Canadian women writers
21st-century Canadian screenwriters
21st-century Canadian women writers
Canadian women film directors
Canadian women film producers
Canadian women screenwriters
LGBT film directors
LGBT film producers
LGBT television producers
Canadian LGBT screenwriters
Canadian lesbian writers
Algerian emigrants to Canada
Canadian television directors
Living people
Canadian women television directors
LGBT television directors
21st-century Canadian LGBT people
Lesbian screenwriters